The Kunming–Yuxi–Hekou railway is a standard-gauge railway in Yunnan Province of China, linking the provincial capital Kunming with the town of Hekou on the Vietnamese border. Constructed in several stages between 1989 and 2014, the Kunming–Yuxi–Hekou railway has largely replaced the Chinese section of the old metre-gauge Kunming–Haiphong railway for normal passenger and cargo transportation. The line is electrified, but single-tracked over most of its length.

The line consists of three segments:
 Kunming–Yuxi railway, length , opened in December 1993, upgraded in 2016;
 Yuxi–Mengzi railway, length , opened in February 23, 2013;
 Mengzi–Hekou railway, length , opened in December 1, 2014.

Route
Although the new line roughly parallels the Kunming–Hekou section of the old narrow-gauge Kunming–Hai Phong railway, the two lines' routes are significantly different.

Kunming–Yuxi
The Kunming–Yuxi railway or Kunyu railway, is a single-track railroad in Yunnan Province of Southwest China. The line runs  from Kunming to Yuxi and was built from 1989 to 1993. Bridges and tunnels account for 22% of the total length of the line.

The major upgrade project of Kunming–Yuxi railway started in 2010, and completed in 2016. The EMU train entered into operation from December 29, 2016.

A branch line, the Yuxi–Mohan railway opened in December 2021. It leads from Yuxi to Mohan where it connects to the Boten–Vientiane railway at the Chinese–Laotian border.

Yuxi–Mengzi
The line runs  from Yuxi in central Yunnan to Mengzi City in southern Yunnan. Construction began on December 15, 2005, and was completed in mid-August 2012 and the line opened to commercial service on February 23, 2013.

Cities and towns along route include Yuxi, Tonghai County, Jianshui County and Mengzi.

Mengzi–Hekou
The Mengzi–Hekou rail line runs  from Mengzi City in southern Yunnan to the Hekou Yao Autonomous County on the border with Vietnam. Construction began in December 2008 and the line entered operation in December 2014, with two trains running daily from Kunming to Hekou and the travel time of 6 hours. Regular passenger service operates between Hekou North and Kunming, with some trains continuing to Dali.

A key element of the Mengzi–Hekou railway is the Taiyangzhai Tunnel (太阳寨隧道). The 7,414 metre-long tunnel is located in Yaoshan Township (瑶山乡) of Hekou County. Construction workers' working conditions in this tunnel have been reported as particularly difficult: with the temperature in the tunnel reaching 43 °C and relative humidity 98%, it was nicknamed the "sauna tunnel" by the workers. Drilling of this tunnel was completed in September 2013, making it possible for the entire railway project to stay on time for the completion by the end of 2014.

Connections to the narrow-gauge network
A short metre-gauge connector line operates at Hekou North railway station to facilitate transfers of passengers and cargo to the Vietnamese metre-gauge section of the Kunming–Haiphong railway, in both directions.

Gallery

References

Railway lines in China
Rail transport in Yunnan